Mazin Gilbert is an electrical engineer with Google. He earned his Ph.D. (1991) and BEng (1987) in Electrical and Electronic Engineering from Liverpool University, and an MBA for Executives, from the Wharton Business School (2009).

Gilbert was named a Fellow of the Institute of Electrical and Electronics Engineers (IEEE) (2012) for his contributions to speech recognition, speech synthesis, and spoken language understanding. He specializes in artificial intelligence, software defined networking, digital transformation, cloud technologies, software platforms, and big data.  

While at AT&T Labs, he was the Vice President of Advanced Technologies and Systems. Gilbert is also a recipient of the AT&T Science & Technology Medal, an author of the book on artificial neural networks for speech analysis/synthesis, and an editor of the book on artificial intelligence for autonomous networks. Gilbert has 200 US patents and 100+ publications. 

In 2021 he joined Google as Director of Engineering, Telecommunications & Orchestration, Analytics and Automation.

References 

Fellow Members of the IEEE
Living people
Year of birth missing (living people)
American electrical engineers